Vicente Banet was a Cuban tennis player.

In the 1920s he featured in seven Davis Cup ties for Cuba, winning four singles rubbers. His wins came against Jack Wright (Canada), Gilbert Nunns (Canada), Ignacio De La Borbolla (Mexico) and Ricardo Tapia (Mexico). He was part of Cuba's first ever Davis Cup team, with the island one of five countries to debut in the 1924 International Lawn Tennis Challenge.

Banet won two bronze medals for Cuba at the 1930 Central American and Caribbean Games.

See also
List of Cuba Davis Cup team representatives

References

External links
 
 

Year of birth missing
Year of death missing
Cuban male tennis players
Central American and Caribbean Games medalists in tennis
Central American and Caribbean Games bronze medalists for Cuba
Competitors at the 1930 Central American and Caribbean Games